Aishwarya College of Education (ACE) is a college in Jodhpur, Rajasthan. It is located in Kamla Nehru Nagar, Jodhpur. It is affiliated to Jai Narain Vyas University and Rajasthan Technical University. It was established in 1999.

History

Aishwarya College of Education established in 1999. And it is affiliated to Jodhpurs one of the oldest and famous universities Jai Narain Vyas University and Rajasthan Technical University.

In this college, almost 3000 students, and currently chairperson is Bhupendra Singh Rathore.

References

Colleges in Jodhpur
Educational institutions established in 1999
1999 establishments in Rajasthan